NOTW may refer to:

 News of the World (disambiguation)
 Not of this World (disambiguation)
 The Name of the Wind, a 2007 fantasy novel by Patrick Rothfuss